Barron is a town in Barron County in the U.S. state of Wisconsin. The population was 873 at the 2010 census. The town surrounds the City of Barron.

Geography
Barron is located in the center of Barron County. The Yellow River, a tributary of the Red Cedar River, crosses the town from northwest to southeast, passing through the city of Barron. U.S. Route 8 crosses the town from east to west, leading east  to Cameron and west  to Turtle Lake. Wisconsin Highway 25 crosses the town from north to south.

Demographics
As of the census of 2000, there were 1,014 people, 319 households, and 267 families residing in the town. The population density was 30.7 people per square mile (11.9/km2). There were 323 housing units at an average density of 9.8 per square mile (3.8/km2). The racial makeup of the town was 97.93% White, 0.59% Black or African American, 0.10% Asian, 0.59% from other races, and 0.79% from two or more races. Hispanic or Latino of any race were 0.79% of the population.

There were 319 households, out of which 38.9% had children under the age of 18 living with them, 73.7% were married couples living together, 7.2% had a female householder with no husband present, and 16.3% were non-families. 10.7% of all households were made up of individuals, and 6.9% had someone living alone who was 65 years of age or older. The average household size was 2.98 and the average family size was 3.18.

In the town, the population was spread out, with 27.8% under the age of 18, 7.9% from 18 to 24, 24.0% from 25 to 44, 25.4% from 45 to 64, and 14.9% who were 65 years of age or older. The median age was 38 years. For every 100 females, there were 97.7 males. For every 100 females age 18 and over, there were 95.2 males.

The median income for a household in the town was $46,500, and the median income for a family was $48,558. Males had a median income of $30,789 versus $20,625 for females. The per capita income for the town was $16,776. About 4.0% of families and 6.3% of the population were below the poverty line, including 9.5% of those under age 18 and 7.2% of those age 65 or over.

References

Towns in Barron County, Wisconsin
Towns in Wisconsin